The Ekibastuz–Kokshetau high-voltage line is an alternating current electrical power transmission line in Kazakhstan from Ekibastuz to Kokshetau.  It was the first commercially used power line in the world which operated at 1,150 kV, the highest transmission line voltage in the world.  It is a part of the Itatsk (Sharypovo)–Barnaul–Ekibastuz–Kokshetau–Kostanay–Chelyabinsk (Siberia–Kazakhstan–Urals) transmission system, which was designed to transfer electricity from Siberia and Kazakhstan to industrial regions in the Urals.

Designated as power line number 1101, it runs  from Ekibastuz to Kokshetau. The weight of the conductors between the spans is approximately 50 tons. With a voltage of 1,150 kV, the line had a maximum transfer capacity of 5,500 MW.

History
In 1973, the Soviet Union built a three-phase UHV experimental test circuit over a kilometre long at the Beily Rast substation, near Dmitrov in Moscow region.  In 1978, a 270 km UHV test line for industrial use was built from Sharypovo to Novokuznetsk.  In 1985, this test line became part of the Siberia–Urals line.  At the time, no other country had an operational UHV line of this voltage, although several other countries were running experiments.

On 24 March 1977, the Central Committee of the Communist Party of the Soviet Union and the Council of Ministers of the Soviet Union took a decision to construct the Ekibastuz–Centre (Tambov) 1,500 kV direct current line.  This line was put under construction but never finished.  In addition, the Ekibastuz–Urals line was planned. Construction of this line started in 1980. The Ekibastuz–Kokshetau line was commissioned at the end of July 1985.  The technical design of the line was done by Energosetproekt. The main contractor was Specsetstroy, while contractors for the 1,150 kV substations were Ekibastuzenergostroy and Yuzhuralenergostroy. Equipment for substations was provided by Zaporozhtransformator, Elektrosila, and Uralelektrotyazhmash.

In 1988, this 1,150 kV line was extended to Kostanay. By 1990, the whole line from Barnaul to Chelyabinsk was built; however, as 1,150 kV substations were built only in the territory of Kazakhstan, the rest of this system operated at 500 kV. After dissolution of the Soviet Union in 1991, the whole Siberia–Urals transmission system was downgraded to 500 kV.  In 1998, the Siberia–Urals line was extended from Barnaul to Itatsk.

Sites

References

Bibliography
 Research Institute of Development Assistance (Japan), Regional cooperation in central Asia : focusing on infrastructure development, The Overseas Economic Cooperation Fund, Japan, Research Papers No. 27, July 1998 .
 
 

Buildings and structures built in the Soviet Union
Electric power infrastructure in Kazakhstan
High-voltage transmission lines
Energy in the Soviet Union
1985 establishments in the Kazakh Soviet Socialist Republic